Grand Falls is a civil parish in Victoria County, New Brunswick, Canada; the legal name in French is Grand-Sault, the only parish with different English and French names.

For governance purposes it is entirely within the town of Grand Falls, which is a member of the Northwest Regional Service Commission.

Before the 2023 governance reform, the town of Grand Falls was much smaller in area and the remainder of the parish formed the local service district of the parish of Grand Falls.

The town of Grand Falls is treated separately from the parish in the Territorial Division Act, the only instance of a municipality being separated from a parish. The town's modern municipal boundaries extend well beyond its description in the TDA.

Origin of name
The parish was named for the waterfall located in the modern town of Grand Falls.

History
Grand Falls was erected in 1853 from all of Andover Parish north of the Aroostook River and all of Perth Parish north of a line due east from the northwest angle of the Tobique Indian Reserve. The parish included all or most of Denmark, Drummond, and Lorne Parishes, as well as parts of Gordon and Saint-André Parishes.

In 1862 the boundary with Saint-Léonard Parish was altered.

In 1864 part of Grand Falls was included in the newly erected Gordon Parish, which included Lorne Parish.

In 1872 all of Grand Falls east of the Saint John River was erected as Drummond Parish.

In 1913 Grand Falls Parish was legally separated from the town of Grand Falls.

Boundaries
Grand Falls Parish is bounded:

 on the northeast and east by the Saint John River;
 on the south by the Aroostook River;
 on the west by the American border;
 excluding Grand Falls Town. Grand Falls Town has much smaller boundaries than the municipality of Grand Falls, containing only the Town Plat of Colebrook, which has Everard H. Daigle Boulevard and Harley Hill Street as its northern and southern boundaries and extends almost as far west as the end of Nowlan Street, and the Stewart Grant, which goes north about twice the distance between Everard H. Daigle Boulevard and Avenue 5ième and extends as far back as the junction of Caswell and Coldbrook Streets.

Communities

 Argosy
 Costigan
 Four Falls
 Gillespie Settlement
 Grand Falls Portage
 Limestone
 Lower California
 Lower Portage
 McCluskey
 Morrell
 Ortonville
 Upper California
 Grand Falls
 Colebrooke West

Bodies of water
Bodies of water at least partly in the parish:

 Aroostook River
 Saint John River
 Rapide de Femme
 Four Falls Stream
 Limestone Stream
 Costigan Lake
 McCullion Lake
 Mud Lake
 Piries Lake
 Round Lake

Demographics
Parish population total does not include portion within Grand Falls

Population
Population trend

Language
Mother tongue  (2016)

See also
List of parishes in New Brunswick

Notes

References

Parishes of Victoria County, New Brunswick
Local service districts of Victoria County, New Brunswick